Dallas Open, may refer to:
 AT&T Byron Nelson, a golf tournament in Texas on the PGA Tour, formally known as the Dallas Open
 Dallas Open (2022), a current tennis tournament held since 2022.
 Dallas Open (1983), a defunct tennis tournament held only in 1983.
 Greater Dallas Open, a defunct golf tournament on the Web.com Tour.
 Dallas Open (1926), a professional golf event in Texas played only in 1926.

See also